Nasreen Jalil (born: 22 February 1944, Lahore) is a Pakistani politician and a senior leader of the  Muttahida Qaumi Movement. She served as a member of the Senate of Pakistan from Sindh from 2012 to 2018. Previously, she served as the Deputy Mayor of Karachi.

Early life

Jalil was born in Lahore on 22 February 1944, then part of India, her family were from the United Provinces but had settled in Karachi. Her father, Zafarul Ahsan was the deputy commissioner of Lahore at the time of the British Indian Empire in 1947, and later he worked as an Indian Civil Service (ICS) officer. Her sister is the Pakistani architect, Yasmeen Lari.

Political career

Nasreen Jalil was elected to the senate of Pakistan in March 1994 for a six-year term. She was member of the Senate Standing Committees on Commerce and on Foreign Affairs, Kashmir Affairs and Northern Affairs and on Health, Social Welfare and special Education and also Chairperson on Functional Committee on Human Rights.

In January 2006 she became Naib Nazim of Karachi, during the swearing in ceremony Jalil pledged that underdeveloped areas of the city would be developed and also that women's rights would be safeguarded.

In the Senate election held on 2 March 2012, Nasreen Jalil was elected as a senator from Sindh.

Nasreen Jalil is the deputy convener of Muttahida Qaumi Movement Khalid Maqbool Group's (MQM-P) Coordinate Committee.

She is the chairperson of Senate's Standing Committee on Finance, Revenue, Economic Affairs, Statistics, P&D and Privatization.

References

1944 births
Living people
Governors of Sindh
University of Karachi alumni
Muhajir people
Muttahida Qaumi Movement politicians
Mayors of places in Pakistan
Pakistani people of Iraqi descent
Mayors of Karachi
Politicians from Karachi
Politicians from Lahore
21st-century Pakistani women politicians
Pakistani senators (14th Parliament)